The Clipper Round the World Yacht Race is a biennial race that takes paying amateur crews on one or more legs of a circumnavigation of the globe in 11 specially-designed identical yachts owned by Clipper Ventures. Professional skippers and additional qualified persons (AQPs) lead each teams on the 10-month journey. All participants must complete a four week training course before starting the race. The race was conceived in 1995 by Sir Robin Knox-Johnston and is run by Clipper Ventures plc. The race has been held every two years since 1996, although in 2004 there was not a race and biennial racing resumed in 2005.

In contrast to the now-defunct Global Challenge, the Clipper Race route follows the prevailing currents and winds and uses lighter, faster boats. The current fleet of 11 yachts are Clipper 70 yachts that were first used in the 2013–14 race. Previous race fleets were composed of eight Clipper 60s and ten Clipper 68s.

Initial races did not feature corporate or sponsor branding. But in 2000, The Times newspaper signed on as title sponsor and a portion of the fleet was sponsored by international cities. Since then, the yachts in the fleet have been sponsored by countries' tourism boards, port cities or corporate sponsors. Clipper Ventures gifted the naming of a yacht to UNICEF to help raise awareness and funds for the organisation. 

In 2018, Wendy Tuck was the first female skipper to win the Clipper Round the World Yacht race with her team. That year also saw another record with Nikki Henderson being named as the youngest skipper ever at just 25 years of age. Nikki Henderson and her team came in second place in the 2018 race.

Origin
The race was conceived in 1995 by Sir Robin Knox-Johnston who together with William Ward (CEO), founded Clipper Ventures, a company that would run the race. Jeremy Knight initially joined as Finance Director in 1998, but later became the Chief Operating Officer. 

The origins of the race name "Clipper" comes from the historic tea clippers. In the 1830s tea clippers were small, fast, cargo carrying sailing ships. Premium prices were paid for the season's first consignment of tea to reach London from China. In the Great Tea Race of 1866, four of these ships held an unofficial race, and this inspired the name of the modern day race. The eight Clipper 60 yachts were initially named after tea clippers including Ariel, Blackadder, Taeping and Thermopylae.

Since 1996, the Clipper Race has taken almost 5000 people from all walks of life and from all around the world and turned them into long distance racers. Almost 40% have no previous sailing experience.

Trophy
Teams competed for the Times Clipper 2000 trophy, made of lead crystal. In 2015 the trophy was replaced with the Clipper 'Race Globe' trophy.

Yachts

Clipper 60 

The fleet for the 1996, 1998, 2000 and 2002 races featured the "Clipper 60", a 60-foot yacht designed by David Pedrick and built by Colvic Craft. The design was based on the Camper and Nicholson Bluewater 58 cruising yacht. Modifications were made to the cruising version including a new deck layout better suited to ocean racing and an enlarged rig. Eight Clipper 60s were built. After the 2002/3 race, some of the Clipper 60s were initially retained for use in crew training and corporate events, but all have now been sold (for example Antiope now operates as a charter yacht based in Iceland).

Yacht names

Clipper 68 

For the 2005 race, a new fleet of Clipper 68s was built to replace the Clipper 60s. The 68-foot yachts were designed by Ed Dubois and the fleet increased from eight boats to ten. The Clipper 68's longer hull line, taller mast, lighter overall weight (two tons lighter than its predecessor), and a flatter bottom meant faster boat speeds. The Clipper 68s have logged downwind surfs approaching 30 knots. The yachts were built in China, the first time a fleet of racing yachts had been built in mainland China. Clipper Ventures managed the build themselves with Jeremy Knight heading up the project. In 2010 an additional Clipper 68 was built to replace one which was lost when it ran aground.

The Clipper 68s were retired after the 2011-12 race. Two of the yachts are now based in Australia where they are used for crew training and corporate sailing.

Yacht names 

CV5 and CV10 were delivered to Australia where they are used by Clipper Ventures for crew training.
CV1 and CV11 are for sale.

Clipper 70 

From Clipper 2013 onwards, the races feature the Clipper 70, designed by Tony Castro Naval Architects. The fleet of twelve Clipper 70s were built in Qingdao, China in a project headed up again by Jeremy Knight for use in the 2013–14 race.

Yacht names

Races 

The race ran every two years between 1996 and 2002, and then skipped a year, with subsequent races beginning in 2005, 2007, 2009, 2011, 2013, 2015, 2017 and 2019. The routes used for the races have varied slightly each race. The routes are selected to allow for a high proportion of downwind sailing, the most technically demanding point of sail. Other considerations include port stops in locations related to yacht or race sponsors.

The first race took place in 1996 with the Clipper 60 fleet departing from Plymouth for a westward circumnavigation with the first stop at Madeira, Fort Lauderdale, Panama, Galapagos, Hawaii, Yokohama, Shanghai, Hong Kong, Singapore, Seychelles, Durban, Cape Town, Salvador (Brazil), the Azores and back to Plymouth. The 1998 race largely followed the same route as the 1996 race. It was won by Alex Thomson, who was the youngest skipper to win a round the world yacht race at just 24. The 2000 race started in Portsmouth harbour. The stop in the Azores was replaced by one in New York City and to compensate for the extra distance the Seychelles to Durban to Cape Town leg was reduced to Mauritius to Cape Town. The 2002 race was the fourth and final circumnavigation for the Clipper 60 fleet. Three of the boats were renamed, and international cities Hong Kong, Cape Town and New York were added to the race. The start point was moved to Liverpool, and an estimated 40,000 spectators came to see the boats off despite a 24-hour delay due to storms in the Irish Sea.

The ten Clipper 68 yachts had their debut in the 2005–06 race in the first east to west circumnavigation. The boats were all sponsored by international cities for the first time incorporating stops in sponsor cities. The race schedule was significantly altered when Glasgow Clipper reported keel problems in the South China Sea, and diverted to Subic Bay in the Philippines, followed by the rest of the fleet that were showing symptoms, causing an enforced six-week stopover. The 2007–08 race stopped at several different cities to the 2005–06 race due to different race sponsors but still maintained the east to west route. Two yachts were dismasted in the Pacific crossing with several crew evacuated via Coast Guard rescue. The Clipper 2009–10 race started from Kingston upon Hull on the Humber Estuary on 13 September 2009.  The race was won by Spirit of Australia on 17 July 2010, when the yachts returned to Hull Marina for a gala celebration. On 15 January 2010, Cork Clipper ran aground on the Gosong Mampango reef in the Java Sea The crew successfully evacuated the yacht and it was abandoned a few days later after the decision was made that any attempt to salvage her would be uneconomical. A Challenge 67' yacht "Aurora of London" was chartered to replace the Clipper 68 yacht in the race.

The 2011–12 race was the last for the Clipper 68 yachts, departing from Ocean Village in July 2011.  The race started in the Solent lasting almost a year and covering an estimated . The race saw a number of injuries that required evacuation. Two crew were evacuated from Gold Coast Australia in Taiwan harbour after an attempted Coast Guard evacuation was abandoned due to inclement weather. An incident on the Geraldton Western Australia yacht saw two injured crew evacuated from the yacht by US Coastguard Cutter Bertholf in the Pacific.

The 2013–14 race was the first for the expanded fleet of twelve Clipper 70 yachts. For the first time five of the yachts were sponsored by companies rather than cities. The race set off from London's St. Katherine Docks in September 2013. The 2015–16 race set sail on Sunday 30 August 2015, once again from London's St Katharine Docks. The race was once again sponsored by a mixture of cities and companies.

The 2015–2016 race saw the first fatalities in the history of the Clipper race, both on the same boat CV21.

In the 2017–2018 race, skipper Wendy Tuck became the first female skipper to win the Clipper race on-board Sanya Serenity Coast.

According to an article in The Times, the postponement of the 2019-2020 race due to the COVID-19 pandemic led to the company making a loss of £1.5m on sales of £1m in the financial year to January 2022.

Sponsorship 

For the inaugural race the yachts did not feature sponsor's branding. In 2000, The Times newspaper came on board as title sponsor, featuring the race as its Millennium project. The event was renamed The Times Clipper 2000 Race and for the first time, the yachts were backed by UK cities. The city concept evolved in subsequent races with entries from international cities. The race now generated one of the highest returns on investment for sponsors compared to other sailing events.

Publicity 

The inaugural race was low-key with the start watched by only a handful of spectators, whereas the start of the 2009–10 race attracted an estimated 150,000 spectators, and the Red Arrows flew overhead.

Incidents

Fatalities
There have been three fatalities in the 20-year history of the Clipper race. The first two incidents took place during the 2015-2016 race, and on the same yacht. The Marine Accident Investigation Branch carried out an investigation into both those incidents and their subsequent report made a number of recommendations for improved safety on board.

Andrew Ashman
At midnight on 5 September 2015 - day 7 of the first leg of the race - the fleet were off the coast of Portugal when Andrew Ashman (49), a watch leader aboard IchorCoal was knocked unconscious as he adjusted the mainsheet while reefing. Resuscitation attempts were not successful and he died. The interim Marine Accident Investigation Branch report found that the injury took place during two uncontrolled gybes, with the boom swinging across the yacht due to a broken preventer.

Sarah Young
Crewmember Sarah Young (40) was tidying the ropes in the cockpit when she was knocked from her position by a wave which swept her backwards, under the guardrail and overboard. She had not been clipped on and was swept away in strong winds. The crew used the signal from her personal AIS transmitter to locate her in the water and then recovered her on board, but were unable to resuscitate her after an hour in the water. Young was buried at sea, with her family's permission, due to the boat's position, and the time it would take to reach land.

Simon Speirs
On 18 November 2017 - day 18 of the Cape Town to Fremantle leg of the 2017/18 race - despite being clipped on, 60-year-old Simon Speirs was washed overboard during a headsail change on CV30 Great Britain. He was recovered from the sea within 36 minutes but did not regain consciousness. He was buried at sea the following morning. The MAIB's initial findings concluded that the hook at the end of his safety tether had deformed under load after being caught under a deck cleat and eventually released.

Loss of yachts
Two yachts have been shipwrecked during the race:

The crew successfully evacuated the yacht and were aided by competitors Team California and Team Finland. Cork Clipper was abandoned a few days later after the decision was made that any attempt to salvage her would be uneconomical.
 On 31 October 2017 at approximately 2140 UTC (2340 local time), Greenings ran aground on the rocky shoreline of the western side of the Cape Peninsula, roughly halfway between Cape Town and Cape Point. A Marine Accident Investigation Branch investigation was undertaken. The yacht was dismantled.

Discovery of 'ghost ship'
On investigation, the body of owner Manfred Fritz Bajorat of Germany was found dead aboard the yacht "in an advance state of decomposition". On reporting the finding to authorities and being unable to provide any further assistance, the LMAX Exchange was permitted to continue on its way. The yacht and occupant were later discovered by fishermen in the Philippine Sea and made international headlines for the macabre nature of the discovery.

Ownership 
In November 2022, The Times reported that Knox-Johnston and Ward were seeking a high net worth individual with an interest in sailing to buy Clipper Ventures PLC, at a price of £60 million but were keen to stay on as president and executive chairman of the company.

References

External links 

www.clipperroundtheworld.com Clipper Race Official Website
www.clipper-ventures.com Clipper Ventures Plc Official Website

www.jamaicaclipper.com Jamaica Clippers' own Website 07–08 Race 

www.facebook.com/clipperroundtheworld Clipper Ventures Facebook page

Recurring sporting events established in 1996
Round-the-world sailing competitions
Yachting races